Julian Watts (born 17 March 1971) is an English football manager and former professional footballer.

He played as a defender most notably in the Premier League for both Sheffield Wednesday and Leicester City. He also played in the Football League for Rotherham United, Shrewsbury Town, Crewe Alexandra, Huddersfield Town, Bristol City, Lincoln City and Blackpool. However his final two clubs saw him pick up more club appearances for any other team he played for with a five year spell at Luton Town followed by a spell in Australia for Northern Spirit, He has since moved into management and has managed Hallam, Shirebrook Town and later Rainworth Miners Welfare.

Playing career
Watts started out with Rotherham United as an apprentice, but after only two years in the first team he moved on to Sheffield Wednesday. He left Sheffield Wednesday in March 1996, after only 18 league appearances, to play for Leicester City. At Leicester he played as they won the 1996 First Division play-off Final. He also contributed to their run in the 1996–97 Football League Cup, being on the pitch as they beat Wimbledon in the semi-final, but was left out of the final squad itself. Whilst at Leicester he scored once; his goal coming in a 3–1 defeat to Chelsea. Watts wore the colours of five more teams before he arrived at Luton Town on loan in 1999. Luton clearly suited Watts, as he became a first team regular, and made 67 league appearances in two seasons. At the end of 2000–01, he decided to join Australian club Northern Spirit, where he played until 2004, when the club folded. Now retired from the game, he returned to England to set up a business in Worksop. In September 2010 he was appointed assistant manager of Maltby Main and in January 2011 manager of Hallam.

Managerial career
On 3 May 2016 Watts, now manager of Nottinghamshire side Rainworth Miners Welfare, was obliged to play once again for a fixture on the final day of the season against Pickering Town; his club were struggling to get a team together due to injuries, work commitments and a youth team cup final. Watts played 54 minutes before replacing himself with substitute Cameron Mitchell. Rainworth lost 4–2.

References

External links

Julian Watts at Aussie Footballers
Lincoln City F.C. Official Archive Profile

1971 births
Living people
Footballers from Sheffield
English footballers
Association football defenders
Rotherham United F.C. players
Sheffield Wednesday F.C. players
Shrewsbury Town F.C. players
Leicester City F.C. players
Crewe Alexandra F.C. players
Huddersfield Town A.F.C. players
Bristol City F.C. players
Lincoln City F.C. players
Blackpool F.C. players
Luton Town F.C. players
Northern Spirit FC players
Rainworth Miners Welfare F.C. players
English Football League players
Premier League players
English football managers
Hallam F.C. managers
Shirebrook Town F.C. managers
Rainworth Miners Welfare F.C. managers